Encore is an album by American country music duo The Louvin Brothers, released in 1961. It is made up of singles and B-sides previously released by Capitol, dating as far back as 1957. It includes the Louvin's number 7 Country Singles hit, "Cash on the Barrel Head".

Reissues
In 1992, all of the tracks from Encore were included in the Close Harmony 8-CD box set issued by Bear Family Records.
Encore was reissued on CD by Capitol Nashville in 2007.

Track listing 
All songs by Ira Louvin and Charlie Louvin unless otherwise noted.
 "Childish Love" – 2:32
 "Love Is a Lonely Street" (Ella Barrett, Faye Cunningham) – 2:41
 "If You Love Me Stay Away" – 2:10
 "Cash on the Barrel Head	" – 2:39
 "New Partner Waltz" – 2:19
 "Stagger" – 2:10
 "Ruby's Song" – 2:22
 "Nellie Moved to Town" – 2:43
 "What a Change One Day Can Make" (Grady Cole) – 2:21
 "Call Me" – 2:18
 "You're Learning" – 2:21
 "My Curly Headed Baby" (Traditional) – 2:26

Personnel
Charlie Louvin – vocals, guitar
Ira Louvin – vocals, mandolin
Jimmy Capps – guitar
Paul Yandell – lead guitar
Don Helms – pedal steel guitar
George McCormick – rhythm guitar
Floyd Chance – bass
Buddy Harman – drums
Production notes:
Ken Nelson – producer

References

The Louvin Brothers albums
1961 compilation albums
Capitol Records compilation albums
Albums produced by Ken Nelson (United States record producer)